The Saharan striped polecat (Ictonyx libycus), also known as Saharan striped weasel and Libyan striped weasel, is a species of mammal in the family Mustelidae.

Characteristics
The Saharan striped polecat is white with dark random stripes. It has black feet, legs, ears and undersides. Often, a white ring goes around the face and above a black snout. They are sometimes confused with the striped polecat, though are generally smaller and have distinct facial markings.

Distribution and habitat
The Saharan striped polecat is distributed around the northern and southern edges of the Sahara in Mauritania, Western Sahara and Morocco in the west along the Mediterranean littoral of North Africa to the Nile Valley in Egypt, while in the south its range is the Sahel east to Sudan and Djibouti.
The Saharan striped polecat lives on the margins of deserts, especially in mountains, in arid, stony terrain and sandy semi-deserts, rarely in woodlands, and prefers steppe-like habitat.

Behaviour and ecology

The Saharan striped polecat is nocturnal and solitary. It hides during the day in other animals' burrows or digs its own. It generally gives birth to one to three young in spring. It moves about at night in the open in a quite deliberate way, with its tail held vertically.
It is known to spray a foul, skunk-like anal emission when threatened. Before releasing the anal emission, it raises its fur in an attempt to warn the potential attacker.

Diet
It eats primarily eggs, small birds, small mammals, and lizards. Much of its prey is tracked down by scent and dug out of burrows, and although it is normally a slow, deliberate mover, it can move quite rapidly and pounce quickly when pursuing prey.

Reproduction
It generally gives birth to one to three young in spring.

Threats
In Tunisia, Saharan striped polecats are often caught and exploited because of the tribal belief that they may increase male fertility.

Taxonomy
The Saharan striped polecat is sometimes characterized as being a part of the genus Poecilictis.

The following subspecies have been proposed for the Saharan striped polecat:

 I. l. libycus
 I. l.  multivittatus
 I. l.  oralis
 I. l.  rothschildi

References

Saharan striped polecat
Mammals of North Africa
Fauna of the Sahara
Sahel
Saharan striped polecat
Taxonomy articles created by Polbot
Taxa named by Christian Gottfried Ehrenberg
Taxa named by Wilhelm Hemprich